This is a list of the IRMA's Irish Singles Chart Top 50 number-ones of 2009.

See also
2009 in music
List of artists who reached number one in Ireland
Irish Singles Chart

External links
Current Irish Singles Chart – Top 50 Positions

Number-one singles
Ireland Singles
2009